Michael Bär (born 12 March 1988) is a Swiss former professional road cyclist.

Major results
2005
 1st Paris–Roubaix Juniors
 2nd Road race, National Junior Road Championships
 7th Overall Grand Prix Rüebliland
2006
 1st  Road race, National Junior Road Championships
 1st Stage 4 Grand Prix Rüebliland
 1st Stage 2 Tour de Lorraine
2010
 1st  Road race, National Under-23 Road Championships
 1st Stage 4 Thüringen-Rundfahrt
 3rd Giro del Mendrisiotto

References

External links

1988 births
Living people
Swiss male cyclists
People from Zug
Sportspeople from the canton of Zug